Rawa Voivodeship was a unit of administrative division and local government in the Kingdom of Poland since 15th century until the partitions of Poland in 1795. It was part of the Province of Greater Poland. Together with the Plock and Masovian Voivodeships it formed the former Duchy of Masovia.

The voivodeship had its capital in the town of Rawa Mazowiecka, and its origins date back to the second half of the 15th century. In 1462, after the deaths of local Piast dynasty dukes, Mazovian lands of Rawa and Gostynin were incorporated into the Crown of the Kingdom of Poland. In 1476, the Land of Sochaczew returned to Poland as well. Borders of Rawa Voivodeship remained unchanged for more than 300 years, until the second partition of Poland in 1793, when it was annexed by the Kingdom of Prussia. 
Rawa Voivodeship had four senators in the Senate of the Polish–Lithuanian Commonwealth. These were the Voivode of Rawa, the Castellan of Rawa, and the castellans of Sochaczew and Gostynin. Local starostas resided in Rawa, Sochaczew and Gostynin.

Zygmunt Gloger in his monumental book Historical Geography of the Lands of Old Poland provides this description of Rawa Voivodeship:

“In the 15th century, the Duchy of Mazovia, ruled by local branch of the Piast dynasty, was divided into three parts, one of which was the Duchy of Rawa (...) On January 1, 1462, Siemowit VI died at the age of eighteen. A few weeks later, his teenage brother Wladyslaw II also died. Siemowit VI was the Duke of Plock and Rawa, and after his death, King Kazimierz Jagiellonczyk decided to incorporate the Duchy of Rawa, making it the first part of Mazovia that returned to Poland (...)

Rawa Voivodeship had the area of 92 sq. miles. It was divided into three lands: those of Rawa, Sochaczew and Gostynin. Each land was divided into two counties. The lands were of roughly the same size, and in the mid-16th century, whole voivodeship had 100 Roman Catholic parishes and 15 towns (...) Sejmiks took place at Rawa, Sochaczew and Gąbin, during which two deputies to the Sejm, and two deputies to the Greater Poland Tribunal were elected (...) Rawa Voivodeship shared its coat of arms with Plock Voivodeship”.

Municipal government
Voivodeship Governor (Wojewoda) seat: 
 Rawa Mazowiecka

Administrative division
 Rawa Land (ziemia rawska, Rawa), 
 Rawa County
 Biała Rawska County,
 Gostynin Land (ziemia gostynińska, Gostynin), 
 Gostynin County 
 Gąbin County,
 Sochaczew Land (ziema sochaczewska, Sochaczew), 
 Sochaczew County 
 Mszczonów County.

Voivodes
Mikołaj z Kutna 1465-1467
Jan Grot z Nowego Miasta 1468-1489
Andrzej Szczubioł 1489-1493
Jakub Buczacki 1493-1496
Andrzej Kucieński 1496-1504
Piotr Prędota z Trzciany 1504-1518
Jakub Gostomski  1518-1519
Andrzej Kucieński 1519-1529 
Stanisław Kucieński  1529-1542 
Andrzej Sierpski 1542-?
Anzelm Gostomski 1572-1588
Stanisław Gostomski  1588-?
Wojciech Wilkanowski ?
Piotr Myszkowski 1597-1601
Zygmunt Grudziński  1601-1618
Stanisław Radziejowski 1618-1627
Filip Wołucki 1627-1642
Krzysztof Marcin Sułowski 1642-1644
Andrzej Grudziński  1644-1650
Łukasz Opaliński 1653-1654 
Aleksander Koryciński  1659-?
Jan Wojciech Lipski  1676
Hieronim Olszowski 1676 
Aleksander Załuski  1676-1692
Aleksander Józef Załuski  1693-1720
Andrzej Głębocki  1720-1735 
Stanisław Wincenty Jabłonowski  1735-1754 
Stanisław Świdziński  1754-1757
Kazimierz Granowski 1757-1774
Bazyli Walicki 1774-1789

References

Sources 
 Rawa Voivodeship, description by Zygmunt Gloger

Voivodeships of the Polish–Lithuanian Commonwealth
 
1462 establishments in Europe
15th-century establishments in Poland
1793 disestablishments in the Polish–Lithuanian Commonwealth
States and territories established in 1462
States and territories disestablished in 1793